Chasmina candida is a moth of the family Noctuidae described by Francis Walker in 1865. It is found from Indo-Australian tropics east to Fiji, including many islands of the Indian Ocean and Pacific.

Description
Its wingspan is about 40 mm. The forewings of the male are quadrate, where the costa somewhat excised. Costal neuration slightly distorted. Male pure white. Palpi and antennae ochreous. Fore tibia and tarsi orange spotted with black. Mid tibia orange above.

The caterpillar is pale brown or greenish with short sparse hairs. It has a brown or yellow stripe along each side of the back, with four small thoracic black dots. Pupa is brownish.

Ecology
The larvae have been recorded on Hibiscus tiliaceus and Thespecia populnea.

References

External links

Australian Insects
 Occurrence of the viable population of Chasmina candida on Praslin Island, Seychelles
Final Instar Caterpillar and Metamorphosis of Chasmina candida (Walker, 1865) from Singapore

Hadeninae
Moths of Madagascar
Moths of Japan
Moths of Africa
Moths described in 1865